O Yin (pronunciation }) is a village of Myaing Township in the Magway Region of central  Myanmar.

Education 
B.E.H.S (sub), O Yin

Religious Places 
O Yin Monastery

Sport 
O Yin Playground

References 

Township capitals of Myanmar
Populated places in Magway Region